Line 2 of the Guangzhou Metro is a north-south line on the system that runs from  to , with a total length of  with 24 stations. All stations in Jiahe Line are underground. Line 2's color is blue.

History 
In 1987, when the Guangzhou Municipal Government along with SYSTRA started planning a metro system, four proposals appeared at the time. After soliciting public opinion, the plan for the “cross shaped network” was finally formed. The section of the north-south L shaped line between Xinshi to Chigang stations in the proposal became the core initial section of Line 2.

It was important to note that during the publishing of this plan, sections of Line 2 were already under construction in accordance to the original cross shaped plan. As a result, the line was proposed to be split between what is today  and Xiaogang stations at a later date. With Line 2 heading south to Nanzhou station but turning east and terminating near what today would be Lijiao station on Line 3. Therefore, reservations to facilitate the dismantling of the line between those Jiangtai Lu and Xiaogang where made during construction. Additionally, the report proposed that the northern section of Line 2 will be extended with two branches splitting at around what is today Lianhe Park (联和公园) where:

 One branch would along Airport Road and National Highway 106 to the, at the time proposed, new international airport
 The other branch goes along Guanghua Road to Jianggao Town, what is today a station on Line 24.

In the 2000 metro plan, the Line 2 alignment was again revised to its current alignment. The Jianggao Branch Line was removed and the section to the new airport was also reduced to what is today Jiahewanggang station additionally the section between  Jiahewanggang and Sanyuanli stations was shifted east to run under the central axis of the now abandoned Old Guangzhou Baiyun International Airport site. The section north of Jiahewanggang to the new airport was replaced by a new Airport Express line that later became Line 3. The original alignment between Jiahewanggang and Sanyuanli stations would later be proposed as the now under construction Phase 2 extension of Line 14 in 2008. In the southern end of Line 2, instead of heading east, the line was redesigned to head further south to what was at the time known as Guangzhou New Passenger Station (Guangzhou South railway station). The section heading east between Nanzhou to today's Lijiao station eventually became a part of the Guangfo Line.

Initial Section 

On December 29, 2002, the first section of Line 2 from Sanyuanli to Xiaogang opened for trial operation with nine stations. Upon opening, it was the first metro line in Mainland China to be equipped with platform screen doors, central air conditioning, rigid overhead line and contactless transit card faregates. On June 28, 2003, the section from Xiaogang to Pazhou were put into service. The total cost of Line 2's first phase was estimated to be 11.309 billion yuan, with an average cost of 486 million yuan per kilometer.

Line 2-8 split project 
During the construction of the first phase of Line 2 there were already plans to modify its alignment. In June 2007, the project was formally approved by the National Development and Reform Commission, and started construction in August. The project will dismantle the original L shaped Line 2 and extend it to the south, west and north; transforming Line 2 into a north-south line and spinning off the east west section into Line 8. The total estimated cost of the project is 14.729 billion yuan.  In 2010, the entire Line 2 from Sanyuanli Station to Wanshengwei Station was suspended between September 22 to 24 and preparations where made to switch the trackage to the new section heading south to Guangzhou South railway station. The project won the 17th China Civil Engineering Zhan Tianyou Award.

Service routes
  — 
  —

Stations
OSI: Out-of-station interchange

Headways

References

02
Railway lines opened in 2002
2002 establishments in China